Colletotrichum orbiculare is a plant pathogen of melons and cucumber. It causes the disease anthracnose that can effect curcubits causing lesions on various parts of the plant. It can effect cucumbers, melon, squash, watermelon and pumpkin, especially when the weather is rainy, humid and warm. It can be transmitted by seed as well as soil and survive between crops. It is also spread by feeding cucumber beetles, splashing water, tools and workers. Efforts to control the fungus include the practice of rotating cucurbits out for a 2-year period, planting cultivars with resistance, burning infected crops and careful control of weeds. Chemical control measures are also available.

Management 
Partners of the CABI-led programme, Plantwise from the Ministry of Agriculture in Zambia have several recommendations for managing C. orbiculare, these include; using certified, disease-free seed and disease tolerant varieties where possible. They also recommend rotating melons with breaks of at least 2–3 seasons with cereals, legumes or brassicas, because the disease stays in the soil for a long time. They suggest destroying any volunteer crops by burying outside of fields and pruning plants to reduce humidity and increase airflow.

Sources

References

External links

orbiculare
Fungal plant pathogens and diseases
Fruit and vegetable pathogens and diseases
Fungi described in 1838